The Iberian conifer forests is a Mediterranean forests, woodlands, and scrub ecoregion in southwestern Europe. It includes the mountain forests of southern and central Spain.

The ecoregion has montane Mediterranean climate. Rainfall averages 1,100 mm annually, and can exceed 1,500 mm in some high-altitude areas. Below-freezing temperatures and snow are common in the winter months.

Geography
The ecoregion covers higher elevations in several disconnected ranges in southern and central Spain.

The Sierra Nevada lies in Andalucia, overlooking the Mediterranean Sea. The Sierra de Baza lies close to the northeast.

The Sierra de Castril lies northeast of the Sierra de Baza, between the Andalucian and Iberian mountains.

The ecoregion covers the southern ranges of the Sistema Ibérico, including the Sierra de Gúdar, Sierra de Albarracín, and Sierra de Javalambre. It also includes the Sierra de Guadarrama, the eastern portion of the Sistema Central.

Flora 
Pine forests are the characteristic plant community, with Black pine (Pinus nigra salzmannii), Scots pine (Pinus sylvestris), Maritime pine (Pinus pinaster), Stone pine (Pinus pinea), and Aleppo pine (Pinus halepensis) are predominant. Spanish fir (Abies pinsapo) grows in the southern part of the ecoregion. Juniper woodlands dominated by Juniperus thurifera, Juniperus phoenicea and Juniperus oxycedrus grow on dry, rocky slopes.

Mixed forests of pines and broadleaf trees grow at middle to lower elevations in areas with deeper soils and higher humidity. Broadleaf trees include Quercus faginea, Quercus pyrenaica, Ulmus glabra, Fraxinus angustifolia, lindens (Tilia spp.), Sorbus spp., and maples (Acer spp). Taxus baccata, Betula pubescens and Populus tremula grow in sheltered canyons with year-round moisture.
Heathlands dominated by Calluna vulgaris, Ulex and Juniperus communis grow in the northern part of the ecoregion.

Evergreen oaks, chiefly holm oak (Quercus rotundifolia), cork oak (Quercus suber) and kermes oak (Quercus coccifera) and maquis shrubland dominated by Olea europaea, Ceratonia siliqua, Laurus nobilis, Arbutus unedo, Rhamnus alaternus, Pistacia terebinthus, Pistacia lentiscus, Erica arborea, Erica scoparia, Phillyrea angustifolia, Phillyrea latifolia, Myrtus communis and  Chamaerops humilis grow on dry and south-facing slopes at low and mid-elevations.

Fauna
Spanish red deer (Cervus elaphus hispanicus) and roe deer (Capreolus capreolus) are widespread. The Western Spanish ibex (Capra pyrenaica victoriae), a threatened subspecies of goat, was reintroduced to Sierra de Guadarrama National Park in 1991 from the Gredos Mountains further west, and has increased in numbers since.

The Iberian wolf (Canis lupus signatus) lives in limited numbers in the northern ranges. An isolated southern population in the Sierra Morena dwindled in numbers and interbred with dogs, and may now be extinct.

Protected areas
952 km², or 35%, of the ecoregion is in protected areas.

Protected areas include Sierra Nevada National Park, Serrania de Cuenca Natural Park, Sierras de Cazorla, Segura y Las Villas Natural Park, and Sierra de Guadarrama National Park.

External links

References

Ecoregions of Europe
Ecoregions of Spain
Mediterranean forests, woodlands, and scrub
Montane forests
Palearctic ecoregions
Ecoregions of the Mediterranean Basin